Anguppulige Gamini Dayantha Wickremasinghe (born December 27, 1965, Colombo), or Gamini Wickremasinghe, is a former Sri Lankan cricketer who played three Tests and four ODIs between 1989 and 1993. He studied at Nalanda College Colombo.

Selection committee
On 15 September 2017, Wickremasinghe was appointed as one of the selectors of the Sri Lanka national cricket team. He along with former selector, Asanka Gurusinha and three new persons included former national team manager Jeryl Woutersz, and former domestic Sri Lankan cricketer, Sajith Fernando was appointed to the committee with the chief selector Graeme Labrooy.

References 

 Nelson Mendis - head coach of Nalanda
 'Best' can often go unrewarded

External links 
 Cricinfo article on Gamini Wickremasinghe

1965 births
Living people
Basnahira North cricketers
Nondescripts Cricket Club cricketers
Sri Lanka One Day International cricketers
Sri Lanka Test cricketers
Sri Lankan cricketers
Alumni of Nalanda College, Colombo
Wicket-keepers